Pentastemonodiscus is a monotypic genus of flowering plants belonging to the family Caryophyllaceae. The only species is Pentastemonodiscus monochlamydeus.

Its native range is Afghanistan.

References

Caryophyllaceae
Monotypic Caryophyllaceae genera